NHL Championship 2000 is a video game developed by Radical Entertainment and published by Fox Sports Interactive for PlayStation and Microsoft Windows in 1999.

Reception

The game received average reviews on both platforms according to the review aggregation website GameRankings.

Notes

References

External links
 

1999 video games
Fox Interactive games
National Hockey League video games
PlayStation (console) games
Radical Entertainment games
Video games developed in Canada
Video games scored by Graig Robertson
Video games set in 2000
Windows games